Escalon (Spanish: Escalón, meaning "Step") is a city in San Joaquin County, California, United States. The population was 7,132 at the 2010 census, up from 5,963 at the 2000 census. Escalon is a Spanish word meaning "stepping stones." The name comes from founder James Wheeler Jones who came upon the name in a book in the Stockton Free Library and liked the name so much he gave the name to the town.

History
Before the advent of the railroad, the traveler in riding over the French Camp road to the Stanislaus River would notice far out on the plains a large two-story brick house. It was surrounded by trees and shrubs, barns, granaries, and was the only house for miles around. It was the home of "Johnny" Jones, who crossed the plains in 1852 and pitched his tent where Escalon now stands, the country at that time being Government land covered with sage brush. He acquired the amount of land allotted to actual settlers and started to farm it, planting the first grain ever grown in the Escalon country, seeding it broadcast and dragging it in with brush. The yield was heavy and sold for five cents a pound. He began raising cattle for market and purchasing more land until he possessed a small kingdom, 8,000 acres, a tract of land over three miles square. It was no unusual sight to see from six to twelve-horse teams plowing over the field where Escalon now stands. In 1867 he built the brick house for his family residence at a cost of $12,000. The bricks used for it were made by his brother Richard, from a field east of Sexton station, on the Tidewater Railroad. In those days all freight carried from Stockton to the mines above Sonora went via the French Camp road, and many of the teamsters boarded and lodged at his farm. The plains were the homes of many antelope, which he often served on his table.

Escalon is a Spanish word meaning stepping stones. What relation it has to the town is difficult to imagine. James W. Jones, the founder of the town, is said to have seen the name in a book in the Stockton Free Library and pleasing him he gave the name to the place. His father died in 1893, leaving quite a fortune. He willed the old home place to James W., together with the adjoining 1,000 acres. The land at that time was not of any great value, but in the following year along came the Valley Railroad, recorded in another chapter, and the land began to increase in value. As soon as Mr. Jones was assured of the railroad crossing the land he engaged a surveyor and laid off the town. The boundary lines run nearly north, south, east and west, but the streets run diagonally, thus some blocks are square, others oblong, some are rectangular and several blocks are triangular in shape.

John McGinnis, in recording some of the first events in Escalon says, "In the month of August, 1894, I was accosted, in Stockton, by a promoter of the townsite, Mr. Harlon, and was prevailed upon to make the trip to Escalon. The four-horse stage was brought forward by the hostler and James Jones, popularly called 'Jim, 'took the ribbons. Leaving there about 9:00 o'clock A. M., driving out the old French Camp Road, we arrived at the Jones home place, the brick house, about noon. With hospitality, an attribute of the Jones family, we sat down to a feast, fit for a king, and did full justice to it. We afterwards walked over and viewed the townsite, east of the then only graded roadbed. It was graded by a railroad company called the 'Valley Road.' We then passed, through a thrifty vineyard, the very first vines to be propagated by Johnny Jones — 'Jim's' father. We then passed the Jones' blacksmith shop just east, across the road from where the Tidewater depot used to be located. I again visited Escalon in 1900. There was then a depot, a store had been built but had not opened for business, the pioneer saloon, and. a temporary hotel on the Jackson property, also used as a dwelling and post office, Mrs. Jackson being postmistress."

As soon as the town was surveyed Mr. Jones built a good sized hotel to accommodate the prospective buyers who came by stage from Stockton, which was located about where the Presbyterian Church now stands. The first Santa Fe train rolled into Escalon in the spring of 1896. The post office and the first store were started by Mrs. Charles Jordan, wife of the station agent, on ground now occupied by the Tuolumne Lumber Company. The second store was built by Nelson Leighton, a large two-story building facing the railroad with a hall above used for social functions. Mr. Leighton installed in his store the first telephone switchboard in Escalon. The first warehouse was built by David L. Jones and John A. Coley in 1897, and another was built later by Haslacher & Kahn, of Oakdale. The first long-distance telephone was installed in John Coley's residence ; and he was the first real estate agent and grain dealer in the town, and built many of the dwellings for rent and sale.

The Escalon Commercial Club, formerly known as the Escalon Board of Trade, was organized March 11, 1911, with the following officers: A. St. John, president; C. H. Sheldon, vice-president ; H. L. MacPherson, secretary ; and R. N. Haines, treasurer. They carried out successfully a Fourth of July celebration in 1913, were active in the formation of the irrigation district, saw the Union high school erected, installed a lighting system; succeeded in getting the supervisors to lay some splendid streets, the town not being incorporated, and held a successful community fair in 1917. The following are the past officers of the club elected in June, 1912: H. L. MacPherson, president; S. J. Irvin, vice-president; O. A. Fish, secretary ; and W. F. Searcy, treasurer ; September 8, 1914, H. L. MacPherson, president; J. H. Martin, vice-president; E. AV. Bidwell, secretary; A. Kerr, treasurer; October 16, 1916, H. L,. MacPherson, president; E. W. Bidwell, vice-president; H. L. Morgensen, secretary; and Dr. J. M. Carr, treasurer; March 10, 1917, John R. Martin, president; S. R. King, vice-president; H. A. Bierschal, secretary; and C. Moorehead, treasurer.

The school was first opened near the celebrated lone tree as early as 1878. It was in session only six months of the year, with an enrollment of 31 boy's and girls, with an aver- age attendance of 15 pupils. After the. founding of Escalon the school district was divided, and a new district school started in the new town. The trustees of the new district, two of them, AV. A. Owens and J. A. Coley, succeeded in getting the people to bond the district for a small sum and the money was used in purchasing a lot about 1903 and erecting a two-room schoolhouse. The first teacher, Miss Stella Reynolds, had formerly taught the Lone Tree school, with splendid success. The school has had a steady and substantial growth during the past decade and in 1914 it was found necessary to provide larger accommodations for the pupils. The citizens cheerfully voted more bonds, the present grammar school grounds were purchased and a hand- some building constructed of hollow tile. The number of scholars continued to increase and last year an additional four class rooms were built' at a cost of $18,000. The entire building was then covered with mastic. One, of the features of the additional rooms was an assembly hall seating about 400 persons which can be used as a public auditorium. Mrs. Grace Taylor Pearce has been principal for the past nine years and under her administration the school has been placed on the accredited list of the county.

It was not until 1916, says Prof. Oliver E. Irons, that the citizens realized the necessity of a high school. The Escalon Commercial Club took the matter in hand and carried on an active bonding campaign. Although they put in plenty of hard work the proposition was defeated by just three votes. In 1919 the club was more successful and at the bond election, May 16, the bonds for a high school carried by a large majority. Immediately a school board of five members were elected, namely, AV. L. Cooms, C. A. Smith, H. L. Morgansen, Otto Peterson and H. H. McKinney, and they have held their offices elected time and again up to the present date.

The Jones club house was secured and school was started in September with Mr. F. AA. Denny and Mrs. A. Cowan as instructors. Mrs. Cowan resigned in mid-year and her place was taken by Miss Orr. The total enrollment the first year was thirty-five. In the second year the enrollment of seventy-five pupils overtaxed the seating capacity of the club house and the citizens of the district voted a bond of $85,000 for suitable high school rooms. The building was completed early this year with the following teachers in charge : Oliver E. Irons, principal ; Paul B. Boehnecke, Miss Nydia Jensen, Miss Minnie Smith, Miss Ruth Williams, and Miss Stella Barnett, under whose able instructions all classes are progressing rapidly.

The Methodist Church has the distinction and honor of being the first church in Escalon. All other churches now found in Escalon have branched out of this church, so declared the Rev. C. G. Zierk. The church was organized in the Lone Tree section in 1893, during the pastorate of the Rev. John Stevens, later for five years pastor of the Central Methodist church of Stockton. While the church was at Lone Tree Corners, it was on a circuit with Farmington, Atlanta, Riverbank and Oakdale. It remained at Lone Tree Corners until September 1908, when the building was moved to Escalon. This building stood on the site of the present church until it was torn down to make room for the new structure, which was completed and dedicated on Sunday, April 10, 1921. Since it has become a separate charge the following pastors have been appointed here: U. L. Walker, L. H. Sanborn, Luther Speers, Smith, McWilliams, A. Z. Bose, S. L. Lee, G. W. Grannis, L. H. Jenkins and C. G. Zierk.

The Evangelical Lutheran Church was organized November 15, 1909, by the Rev. Phillip Andreen of San Francisco, assisted by David Magunson of Stockton. Subscriptions were obtained in November, 1911 and a building was erected, just west of the old school house in 1913. It was dedicated in the summer of the following year, 1914. The following pastors have been in charge, the Rev. W. X. Magnuson, 1912, Dr. P. E. Berg,. 1913; Rev: C. Anderson, 1916; Rev. N. P. Anseen, 1921 : Rev. O. W. Westhng-, 1922.

The Presbyterian Church was organized November 10, 1913, with the following charter members : Mr. and Mrs. Wm. Campbell, Miss Margaret Campbell, Miss Helen Campbell, Mr. S. H. Irwin, Mrs. Minerva H. Erwin, Mr. and Mrs. E. W. Bidwell, Mrs. O. A. Fisk, Miss Leona Kelley, Miss Hazel Delley, Mr. and Mrs. E. A. Clough, Mrs. J. G. Voorhies. Of the original members, ten remain and are living in and around Escalon, three have moved away, and one is deceased. Services were first held in the Community hall, but in 1915 the trustees purchased the pioneer gram- mar school building and fitted it up for church purposes. The first pastor. Rev. E. B. David- son, served until October 1, 1915, and during the succeeding two month the pulpit was occupied by the Rev. A. M. Wood, then the Rev. I. B. Surface was pastor until December 1, 1916. In March, 1917, the Rev. A. L. Bone took charge and installed the following year.
 
Escalon came into being in the late 1800s because of the agricultural production in the immediate area and the need to get products of that agriculture to market by railroad. John Wheeler Jones settled here with his family on the 1850s, and his son, James Wesley Jones, laid out the community of Escalon 40-plus years later. Although Escalon was incorporated in 1957, celebrating its 50-year anniversary in 2007 by proclamation of Escalon's city council, 1994 was officially acknowledged as the year to celebrate the Escalon centennial.

In 1898, the Santa Fe Depot was constructed (along the San Francisco and San Joaquin Valley Railroad line) and operated until 1970. It was located alongside the Santa Fe Railroad Tracks that bisect the heart of Escalon near Main Street's intersections with Second Street.

In 1909, Oliver A. Fisk began construction on the Fisk Building, completing it in 1911. This building is still located at the corner of Main and First Streets in its modified form. The first to occupy this building was the Escalon State Bank, the first bank in town, in 1912. The bank was established by S.J. Irwin, the owner of the Irwin Lumber Company.

Transportation

Highways and Roads
California State Route 120 runs through Escalon connecting it to the Bay Area and to the west through Oakdale where it merges with California State Route 108 to the Sierra Nevada. McHenry Avenue runs south towards Modesto crossing the Stanislaus River over the newly rebuilt McHenry Bridge. Escalon currently has 4 stoplights in town all within a 1/4 mile proximity.

Future Development
South McHenry Avenue: This project will widened from two lanes to three lanes from Narcissus
Way to Jones Road (3300 lineal feet). The improvements will include pavement widening and curb and
gutter on the east side. It is anticipated that no right of way will be required but won't be confirmed until
the project is in the design phase. This project is awaiting approval in 2030 for completion by 2036

Ullrey Ave./ McHenry Ave. Traffic Signal: design and construction of a signal at the
intersection of McHenry Avenue and Ullrey Avenue.

SR 120 at Brennan Avenue
In 2020 $446,066 was approved for intersection improvements, no traffic signal. The project is slated for completion in 2026.

Escalon Bellota Road Improvements
Widen 2 to 4 lanes with shoulders from Escalon City limits to Mariposa Road. Project is estimated to be completed by 2025.

Caltrans Intercity Rail
Construct double main track, panelized turnouts,
relocate/renew siding turnout, and realign existing track. From Stockton to Escalon. No estimated completion date.

French Camp at Hwy 120 Roundabout
The 2020 SHOPP, approved in May 2020, included the following Collision Reduction item of interest, Route 120 near Manteca, at French Camp Road. Construct roundabout. Programmed in FY23-24, with construction scheduled to start in December 2024. Total project cost is $16,204K, with $10,536K being capital.

Railroads

Escalon has two railways through town. The former Tidewater Southern Railway comes west into town from Manteca along Highway 120 until it hits McHenry Avenue and heads south out of town. This railway is owned and operated by Union Pacific Railroad and is still in use today, though the tracks end at the city limits of Jones Avenue.

The other railway in town is the BNSF Railway Stockton Subdivision which has two tracks, divides the town in a northwest to southeast direction. Oftentimes two trains will meet and pass on opposing rails through town, often backing up traffic along Highway 120 for over 20–30 mins. The Santa Fe Railway San Francisco Chief served Escalon as a flag stop until 1971 along this line — this was the final passenger rail service to the town.

Geography
Escalon is located at 37°47.5'N 120°59.5'W (37.7984,-120.9969), where State Highway 120 crosses the BNSF railroad.

Economy

Industry
Escalon has a large agricultural industry which is based on the fertile farmland surrounding the city. Escalon is home to one of the largest walnut processing facilities in the world, DeRuosi Nut. Some of the largest employers in Escalon include; DeRuosi Nut, GoldRiver Orchards, Grower's Choice, and Roche Bros Inc. are many of the nut processing plants that lie in the heart of Escalon accounting for a  great deal of the local agricultural economy. Escalon is always growing its agriculture in new ways.

Principal employers
Major employers in the city include:

Downtown (Main St.)
Escalon's downtown along Main St. has been a focal point of the town's image since inception. Today the strip boasts a bar, restaurants, a salon, and many local family run businesses. Main Street, in more recent years has seen vast redevelopment led by local, Mike DeRuosi. One of the more historic redevelopments was at the site of Escalon's only bar- The Valley Inn. The Valley Inn has been known to be one of the longest running bars in California. The bar has remained a center piece Escalonian culture since the town's early years.

Police
Escalon's Police Department has 12 full-time employees, 4 part-time Animal Services Officers, and volunteers who serve in the capacity of Police Reserve Officers, Cadets, and the Citizen Volunteers.

Education
In 1963, representatives from eight component districts (Burwood, Collegeville, Dent Union, Escalon Union High, Farmington, Four Tree, Lone Tree, and Van Allen)began a series of six meetings commissioned by their component boards to explore the concept of creating one unified school district to serve the educational needs of the districts involved. At the conclusion of these meetings, a recommendation was forwarded to the County Superintendent of Schools that the eight districts form a unified district. The recommendation was approved by the San Joaquin County Board of Education in October 1964.
 
On February 24, 1965, a public hearing was held on the proposal in the Escalon High School library.
An election day of March 8, 1966 was designated by County Superintendent Gaylord Nelson. Voters approved the unification and on March 15, 1966, the San Joaquin Board of Supervisors created what would soon become the Escalon Unified School District, effective July 1, 1967.
 
Currently, the Escalon Unified School District is made up of 4 elementary schools (Collegeville Dual Language Immersion, Dent, Farmington and Van Allen), one middle school (El Portal), one comprehensive high school (Escalon High), one continuation high school (Vista) and one charter school (Escalon Charter Academy/Gateway Home School).

Schools 
Escalon High 
Vista High
El Portal Middle 
Dent Elementary 
Van Allen Elementary
Farmington Elementary
Collegeville Elementary
Escalon Charter Academy

Sports
The Escalon High Cougars represent the local high school in the Trans Valley League, in which they are founding members. The Escalon High Varsity football team has enjoyed numerous success over the years. Winning five State Championships in the past 30 years and two within the last 3 seasons. The Cougars are currently the 31th winningest team in the state of California among all divisions with a record of 590-282-43 as of the end of the 2022 season.

Notable people
 Rod Beaton – an American journalist and media executive with United Press International
 Herbert A. Calcaterra – WWII US Navy sailor for whom the ship USS Calcaterra was named for his deeds during WWII
 Alice Estes Davis – Disney legend/Costume designer for Disney films, television, and theme parks
 James Lew – American martial arts actor

Churches
Escalon is home to 14 churches 12 within city limits. The Escalon Methodist Church has the distinction of being the first church in Escalon, constructed in 1893. The church used to sit at Lone Tree Corners until September 1908, when the building was moved to Escalon. This building stood on site of the present church until it was torn down to make room for the new structure, which was completed and dedicated on Sunday, April 10, 1921.
Escalon Presbyterian Church
Escalon Christian Reformed Church 
Escalon Covenant Church
Trinity Church Assembly of God
First Baptist Church
Jackson Avenue Church
Church of Christ
Saron Lutheran Church
United Methodist Church 
Impact Community Church 
Seventh Day Adventist Church
Pentecostal Tabernacle
Church of Christ
Saint Patrick's Catholic Church

Demographics

The 2010 United States Census reported that Escalon had a population of 7,132. The racial makeup of Escalon was 5,823 (81.6%) White, 30 (0.4%) African American, 80 (1.1%) Native American, 96 (1.3%) Asian, 22 (0.3%) Pacific Islander, 823 (11.5%) from other races, and 258 (3.6%) from two or more races. Hispanic or Latino of any race were 1,928 persons (27.0%).

The Census reported that 7,117 people (99.8% of the population) lived in households, 15 (0.2%) lived in non-institutionalized group quarters, and 0 (0%) were institutionalized.

There were 2,476 households, out of which 975 (39.4%) had children under the age of 18 living in them, 1,484 (59.9%) were married couples living together, 291 (11.8%) had a female householder with no husband present, 143 (5.8%) had a male householder with no wife present.  There were 130 (5.3%) unmarried. 469 households (18.9%) were made up of individuals, and 241 (9.7%) had someone living alone who was 65 years of age or older. The average household size was 2.87.  There were 1,918 families (77.5% of all households); the average family size was 3.28.

The population was spread out, with 1,933 people (27.1%) under the age of 18, 675 people (9.5%) aged 18 to 24, 1,736 people (24.3%) aged 25 to 44, 1,898 people (26.6%) aged 45 to 64, and 890 people (12.5%) who were 65 years of age or older.  The median age was 36.0 years. For every 100 females, there were 96.0 males.  For every 100 females age 18 and over, there were 95.2 males.

The homeowner vacancy rate was 2.5%; the rental vacancy rate was 5.9%.  5,082 people (71.3% of the population) lived in owner-occupied housing units and 2,035 people (28.5%) lived in rental housing units.

References

External links

Official website
Escalon Unified School District

Cities in San Joaquin County, California
Incorporated cities and towns in California
San Joaquin Valley
1957 establishments in California
Populated places established in 1957